Slovak pair Jana Čepelová and Chantal Škamlová were the defending champions. They defeated Tímea Babos and Gabriela Dabrowski in the 2010 final, but chose to not start this year.

An-Sophie Mestach and Demi Schuurs won the title, defeating Eri Hozumi and Miyu Kato in the final, 6–2, 6–3.

Seeds

Draw

Finals

Top half

Bottom half

External links 
 Main draw

Girls' Doubles
Australian Open, 2011 Girls' Doubles